The Red Maple Award is an award in the Ontario Library Association (OLA) Forest of Reading Awards. The Red Maple Award celebrates fiction (since 1998) and non-fiction (every other year since 2005) Canadian books for grades 7–8 (12–14) every year. Out of ten nominated books in each category students must read a minimum of five to vote for their favourite. The winner is chosen by the most popular book in all participating libraries, schools, groups, etc.

History 
Five years after the original Silver Birch Award was created an award for grades 7–9, the Red Maple Award was created. In 2005 a non-fiction subcategory of the Red Maple Award was created. It runs on all odd-numbered years.

Winners 
So far, there have been 22 awards in fiction and 8 in non fiction.

Only seven authors have won the award more than once: Eric Walters (2001, 2007 Fiction, 2008, 2015 Fiction) with four, Susin Neilsen (2010, 2014, 2020) and Kenneth Oppel (2005 Fiction, 2006, 2012) with three each, and Gayle Friesen (1999, 2003), Wesley King (2013 Fiction, 2019 Fiction), Norah McClintock (2004, 2009 Fiction), and Andreas Schroeder (2005 Non-fiction, 2007 non-fiction) with two each. Friesen was the first to win the award twice, while Walters was the first to win three and four times.

Kenneth Oppel was the first to win back to back in 2005 and 2006, followed by Eric Walters in 2007 and 2008. Andreas Schroeder was the first to win back to back in non-fiction in 2005 and 2007.

Carol Matas was the first fiction winner, while Andreas Schroeder was the first non-fiction winner.

Fiction

Non-fiction

Nominated Books 
These are the books that were nominated for a Red Maple Award each year but were not chosen as a winner.

Fiction (1998-2007) 
The books are ordered by year and the author's last name (Last name of first author if multiple).

Fiction (2008-2017)

References

Literacy-related awards
Canadian children's literary awards
1998 establishments in Ontario
2005 establishments in Ontario
Awards established in 1998
Awards established in 2005